Monardia is a genus of wood midges, insects in the family Cecidomyiidae. The 53 described species in Monardia are grouped into three subgenera.

Species
These 53 species belong to the genus Monardia:

Subgenus Monardia
Monardia abnormis Mamaev, 1963
Monardia armata Jaschhof, 2003
Monardia canadensis Felt, 1926
Monardia carinata (Plakidas, 2017)
Monardia caucasica Mamaev, 1963
Monardia crassicornis Mamaev, 1963
Monardia dividua Jaschhof, 2004
Monardia kamtshatica (Mamaev, 1993)
Monardia kollari (Winnertz, 1870)
Monardia lapponica Jaschhof & Jaschhof, 2020
Monardia lignivora (Felt, 1907)
Monardia magna Edwards, 1938
Monardia malaisei Jaschhof, 2009
Monardia misella (Mamaev, 1993)
Monardia monilicornis (Zetterstedt, 1838)
Monardia multiarticulata Felt, 1914
Monardia nigrita (Mamaev, 1993)
Monardia obsoleta Edwards, 1938
Monardia pediculata (Mamaev, 1993)
Monardia recondita Hardy, 1960
Monardia recta (Mamaev, 1993)
Monardia separata (Mamaev, 1993)
Monardia stirpium Kieffer, 1895
†Monardia submonilifera Meunier, 1904
Monardia ulmaria Edwards, 1938
Monardia yasumatsui Yukawa, 1967
Subgenus Trichopteromyia
Monardia absurda (Mamaev, 1993)
Monardia denticauda (Gagné, 1985)
Monardia dissecta (Fedotova, 2004)
Monardia gracilis (Mamaev, 1993)
Monardia magnifica (Mamaev, 1963)
Monardia manii (Nayar, 1945)
Monardia modesta (Williston, 1896)
Monardia relicta Jaschhof, 2009
Subgenus Xylopriona
Monardia abbreviata Jaschhof & Jaschhof, 2020
Monardia adentis (Jaschhof, 1998)
Monardia articulosa (Felt, 1908)
Monardia atra (Meigen, 1804)
Monardia furcifera Mamaev, 1963
Monardia indica (Sharma & Rao, 1979)
Monardia monotheca Edwards, 1938
Monardia nilgiriensis (Sharma, 1993)
Monardia obscura Jaschhof & Jaschhof, 2020
Monardia ornata (Fedotova, 2004)
Monardia radiella (Mamaev, 1993)
Monardia sejuncta (Mamaev, 1993)
Monardia toxicodendri (Felt, 1907)
Monardia truncata Jaschhof, 2009
Monardia unguifera Berest & Mamaev, 1997
Monardia vividula (Mamaev, 1993)
Incertae Sedis
Monardia fumea Jaschhof, 2004
Monardia furcillata Jaschhof, 2004
Monardia modica Jaschhof, 2004

References

Further reading

 
 

Cecidomyiidae genera
Articles created by Qbugbot

Taxa named by Jean-Jacques Kieffer
Insects described in 1895